Cotahuasi is a town in Southern Peru, capital of the province La Unión in the region of Arequipa.

References

Populated places in the Arequipa Region